Anita Yvonne Stenberg (born 28 August 1992) is a Norwegian female track cyclist, representing Norway at international competitions. She competed at the 2016 UEC European Track Championships in the points race event and scratch event. At the 2016 Norwegian National Track Championships, Stenberg won seven elite national titles in the 500m time trial, pursuit, keirin, omnium, points race, scratch race and sprint.

Major results

2013
3rd Scratch Race, Grand Prix Vienna
2014
National Track Championships
1st  500m Time Trial
1st  Individual Pursuit
1st  Team Sprint
2nd Scratch Race, Track-Cycling Challenge Grenchen
3rd Omnium, Athens Track Grand Prix

2015
National Track Championships
1st  500m Time Trial
1st  Individual Pursuit
1st  Keirin
1st  Omnium
1st  Points Race
1st  Scratch race
1st  Individual Sprint
1st Scratch Race, Milton International Challenge
2nd Points Race, International Belgian Open
Prova Internacional de Anadia
2nd Scratch Race
3rd Omnium
3rd Omnium, Six Days of Ghent

2016
National Track Championships
1st  500m Time Trial
1st  Individual Pursuit
1st  Keirin
1st  Omnium
1st  Points Race
1st  Scratch race
1st  Team Sprint
Trofeu Ciutat de Barcelona
1st Points Race
1st Scratch Race
2nd Scratch race, Six Days of Bremen
2nd Omnium, Six Days of Ghent
Fenioux Piste International
2nd Points Race
3rd Scratch Race

2017
National Track Championships
1st  Points Race
1st  Individual Sprint
1st  Keirin
Nordic Championships
1st Keirin
1st Points Race
1st Sprint
1st Omnium, Keirin Cup / Madison Cup
1st Points Race, International track race – Panevežys
2nd Omnium, US Sprint GP
2nd Omnium, Fastest Man on Wheels

References

External links
 
 
 
 
 
 

1992 births
Living people
Norwegian female cyclists
Norwegian track cyclists
Cyclists at the 2019 European Games
European Games competitors for Norway
Sportspeople from Drammen
Cyclists at the 2020 Summer Olympics
Olympic cyclists of Norway